Winston Churchill Memorial Trusts (WCMT) are three independent but related living memorials to Sir Winston Churchill, based in the United Kingdom, Australia, and New Zealand. They exist  for the purpose of administering Churchill Fellowships, also known as Churchill Travelling Fellowships, to provide an opportunity for applicants to travel overseas to conduct research in their chosen fields.

The Trusts were established in 1965, after the death of Churchill, by a combination of public subscription and government contributions.

History

General

In 1962 Prince Philip, Duke of Edinburgh asked Churchill what type of memorial he would like the world to remember him by. He liked the idea of an unusual type of memorial, to be set up after his death, and suggested something like the Rhodes Scholarships, but available to everybody, on a wider basis. The concept was developed jointly by the English-Speaking Unions of the Commonwealth and of the United States. Several countries planned a nationwide appeal after Churchill's to set up a National Churchill Trust. The plans were kept secret at Lady Churchill’s request until after his death.

The Trusts were founded to "perpetuate and honour the memory of Sir Winston Churchill" by administering the award of travelling fellowships known as Churchill Fellowships.

An attempt in 1964 by then Canadian Prime Minister Lester B. Pearson and George A. Drew to launch a fourth Trust in Canada did not come to fruition, in part due to the illness and death of the latter.

In 2019 The Queen granted permission for Churchill Fellows to use the post-nominal honorific CF; in 2021 the Trusts adopted the operating name of the Churchill Fellowship.

UK
The UK Trust was founded on 1 February 1965, the day after Churchill's funeral. Elizabeth II extended her Royal Patronage to the Trust in 1965.

Australia
Before Churchill's death, planning for the fund-raising appeal for the establishment of a Churchill Trust in Australia continued under the code name Operation “G” (for Gratitude), under the leadership of (later Sir) William John Kilpatrick. Immediately on the announcement of Churchill's death on the 24 January 1965, a nationwide appeal for funds was launched by Prime Minister Robert Menzies, with Kilpatrick as Chairman of the Appeal Committee. Commonwealth and State Governments as well as Australian companies and individuals donated generously. The Returned Services League performed a nationwide doorknock on Sunday 28 of February, which raised £911,000. A total of £2,206,000 was raised, and the Winston Churchill Memorial Trust founded to administer the funds.

Description

General
The recipients organise their own travel and undertake their own research. Upon their return, they submit a report to the Trustees. Once their report is accepted, they are formally installed as Fellows and receive their insignia, consisting of a specially minted Churchill Medal, at a national award ceremony. Applicants must be citizens of the respective country and the research must necessitate foreign travel.

An implication taken from the award of a Fellowship is that the recipient is a leader or has potential leadership in their field of endeavour, and that the Fellowship will strengthen their usefulness to society. They are encouraged to promote the Fellowships, encouraging others to apply, and thus perpetuating the memory of Churchill.

UK
The UK Trust, situated in London, award 150 travelling fellowships to fund successful applicants' travel for four to eight weeks anywhere in the world, researching their chosen topic among global leaders in their field. Upon return, the organisation helps the Fellows to share their learning with professions and communities across the country. They are not academic research grants, but intended for practical research into real-world issues, covering eight themes: Arts and culture; community and citizenship; economy and enterprise; education and skills; environment and resources; health and wellbeing; governance and public provision; and science and technology.

In 2019 the Patron of the Winston Churchill Memorial Trust (UK), Her Majesty Queen Elizabeth II, granted the use of the post-nominal letters "CF" (for "Churchill Fellow") to recipients of the award. The stated aim of the honorific is 'to mark the contribution of Churchill Fellows to national life'. In 2021 the Trusts adopted the operating name of The Churchill Fellowship.

Australia
The Australian WCMT has chapters with regional committees in each state and territory, with the national office at Churchill House in Canberra. All directors and regional committee members serve in an honorary capacity.

The aim of the fellowships is to "provide an opportunity for Australians to travel overseas to conduct research in their chosen field that is not readily available in Australia...with further opportunity in their pursuit of excellence for the enrichment of Australian society". There are no prescriptions as to theme or topic.

Recipients of Churchill Fellowships are entitled to use the post-nominal letters CF upon completion of their fellowship.

New Zealand
The New Zealand WCMT is administered by the Department of Internal Affairs.  Lieutenant-General Sir Jerry Mateparae, former Governor-General of New Zealand, is patron of the Trust, which assists fellows to travel overseas for a period of from three weeks to three months to investigate topics in their trade, industry, profession or business, that will help them to increase their contribution to the community and their field back in New Zealand.

Notable fellows by country and year

United Kingdom
{| class="wikitable"
!Year
!Fellow
!Occupation /profession
!Purpose / project / findings
!Location of study
|-
|1967 ||Dr. Mary Remnant ||Musicologist || Brought back to life, in reconstructed form, the sound of medieval musical instruments depicted on church walls and in carvings across Europe. || Europe
|-
|1971 || Christopher J. Walker ||Historian  ||"...to write a history of modern Armenia". || Armenia
|-
|1976 ||Dr. Jane Wilson-Howarth ||Ecologist  ||Discovered numerous species that were new to science and named one, a springtail, Troglopedetes churchillatus in honour of Churchill. || Nepal
|-
|1981 || John Elkington||Business author ||Environmental industry and its use in implementing the World Conservation Strategy. || United States
|-
|1982 ||Nick Danziger ||Travel artist and author || Travelling on foot and by traditional local transport, Danziger traversed from western Europe to China, and published Danziger’s Travels as a result. ||Western Europe and China
|-
|1983 || Harold Cudmore ||Olympic Sailor Yachtsman ||Developing tactics for match racing|| Bahamas and United States
|-
|1988 ||Charles Farthing||Medical doctor||Studied AIDS at the Bellevue Hospital in New York||United States
|-
|1989 ||Serge Lourie||Housing Association Chair ||Studied urban renewal and housing  in order to help tackle the housing crisis in the United Kingdom||France and United States
|-
|2000
|Paul Darke
|Academic and Disability rights activist
|Exploring disability access to pilgrimages and shrines
|France and Spain
|-
|2014 || Professor Andrew Rowland ||Children's Doctor ||Investigated the impact of mandatory reporting of child abuse, the work of children's advocacy centres and strategies used to identify children at risk of child sexual exploitation and trafficking.|| United States, Cambodia, Singapore, Malaysia, Hong Kong
|-
|2016 || Amy Varle ||Housing consultant ||Pioneering strategies for 21st century homeless prevention and response || United States
|-
|}

Australia
{| class="wikitable"
!Year
!Fellow
!Occupation /profession
!Purpose / project / findings
!Location of study
|-
|1972 ||Lionel Gilbert ||Lecturer and curator ||To study the educational use of museums in the UK || UK
|-
|1972 ||Rob Morrison ||Zoology researcher ||To examine the administration of Field Study Centres and the courses offered in same || UK
|-
|1984||Roger McNeice || Numismatist ||To study developments in the conservation and preservation of coins and medals. || UK
|-
|2008 ||Dr Elizabeth Grant||Architect, anthropologist and academic, University of Adelaide ||To study the design of prisons for Indigenous prisoners  || Denmark, US, Canada, New Zealand
|-
|2009||Sarah Maddison ||Social scientist and academic ||To study models of Indigenous representation  || US and Canada
|-
|2009||Shan Raffel ||Firefighter ||To study emergency planning, preparation and response to fires and other incidents in large tunnels ||  Germany, Denmark, Norway, Austria, Switzerland, Sweden, Canada, US
|-
|2009||Corinne Unger ||Scientist || To study leading practice abandoned mine rehabilitation and post-mining land use || Austria, Germany, United Kingdom and Canada
|-
|2016
|Lindy W. Cayzer
|Botanist
|To unlock critical taxonomic information on the Pittosporaceae in overseas herbaria
|Indonesia, Malaysia, Singapore, Netherlands, France, UK
|-
|2017
|Garry Stewart
|Choreographer
|To undertake a comparative study of seven major international choreographic centres
|Canada, France, India, Netherlands, UK, US
|-
|2017
|Anthea Williams
|Theatre and film director
|To research the best play, writer and audience development models in English speaking theatres
|Canada, United Kingdom, US
|-
|2019||Jared Thomas ||Writer and museum curator ||To investigate colonised people's interpretative strategies in permanent gallery displays  || New Zealand, US, Canada, Norway
|-
|2020||Dr Hannah McGlade ||Academic, human rights advocate and lawyer ||To investigate the establishment and foundation of the Sami parliaments particularly the extent of their vested power, responsibility and representative structure  || Finland, Norway, Sweden
|}

New Zealand
{| class="wikitable"
!Year
!Fellow
!Occupation /profession
!Purpose / project / findings
!Location of study
|-
|1973 ||Don Merton ||Conservationist ||To study the management of endangered species ||US and Europe
|-
|2015 ||Jane Tolerton ||Historian ||To gather information for a book on New Zealand women's work in the First World War ||United Kingdom
|-
|2017 ||Taiaroa Royal ||Choreographer ||To undertake choreographic research with Exhale Dance Tribe to start developing a united choreographic language and voice ||Cincinnati
|-
|2018 ||Richard Davies ||General practitioner ||To study medical clinics providing services to the homeless and vulnerable ||United Kingdom
|-
|2021 ||Veronika Meduna ||Science journalist ||To carry out research for a book on the settlement of the Pacific ||Micronesia, Melanesia and Australia
|}

See also
 International Churchill Society

References

External links
 
 
 

Monuments and memorials to Winston Churchill
Foundations based in the United Kingdom
Foundations based in Australia
Foundations based in New Zealand